Eo Jeong-won (born 8 July 1999) is a South Korean footballer currently playing as a full back for Busan IPark.

Club career
Eo Jeong-won began his career as a right winger under Portuguese manager Ricardo Peres. After only appearing sporadically during his debut season, Eo was loaned out to Gimpo FC at the start of the 2022 season and played at left wing-back. When Busan IPark appointed coach Park Jin-sub to replace Peres in the summer of 2022, Park recalled Eo Jeong-won from his loan spell and made him a regular at left back. In 2022, Eo registered one assist for Gimpo and two assists for Busan.

Career statistics

Club

References

1999 births
Living people
South Korean footballers
Association football midfielders
K League 2 players
Busan IPark players